A' vs. Monkey Kong (titled Monkey Kong in the United States) is the second album by the British alternative rock band A, released via Tycoon Recordings/London Records on 9 September 1999. In May and June 2001, the band toured Europe as part of the Deconstruction Tour.

Track listing 

 Track 1 is an alternate version to the one which originally appeared as a b-side on the "Summer on the Underground" single.

Singles 
A vs. Lake Tahoe (I Love Lake Tahoe)
 CD1:
 "I Love Lake Tahoe" (Radio Edit) – 3:26
 "I Love Lake Tahoe" – 3:57
 "Monkey Kong Jr." – 3:11

 CD2:
 "I Love Lake Tahoe" – 3:11
 "Turn It Down" – 1:20
 "Old Folks" – 3:57
 "Old Folks" (Video)

A vs. Old Folks (Old Folks)
 CD1:
 "Old Folks" – 3:55
 "One Day" – 3:44
 "Don't Be Punks" (Acapella) – 1:28

 CD2:
 "Old Folks" – 3:55
 "She Said" – 3:38
 "We're Equal" – 2:37

Summer On The Underground
 CD1:
 "Summer On The Underground" (Radio Edit) – 4:02
 "I Can't Wait Until Morning" – 3:21
 "Owner Of A Lonely Heart" – 4:36

 CD2:
 "Summer On The Underground" – 4:51
 "For Starters" (Alternate Version) – 2:57
 "Charlie Jordan" – 3:33

"Monkey Kong" and "A" were also each released as singles.

Legacy 
In 2005, readers of Kerrang! magazine voted A vs Monkey Kong the 89th best British rock album ever.

References 

A (band) albums
1999 albums
London Records albums